Robert Edward Ryder VC (17 December 1895 – 1 December 1978) was an English recipient of the Victoria Cross, the highest and most prestigious award for gallantry in the face of the enemy that can be awarded to British and Commonwealth forces.

Ryder was 20 years old, and a private in the 12th Battalion, The Middlesex Regiment (Duke of Cambridge's Own), British Army during the First World War when the following deed took place for which he was awarded the VC.

He later achieved the rank of sergeant.

The Medal
His Victoria Cross is displayed at the Lord Ashcroft VC Gallery in the Imperial War Museum in London, England.

References
Notes

Sources
Monuments to Courage (David Harvey, 1999)
The Register of the Victoria Cross (This England, 1997)
VCs of the First World War - The Somme (Gerald Gliddon, 1994)

External links
The Middlesex Regiment 1755-1966 (detailed history of the original "Die Hards")
Location of grave and VC medal (Middlesex)
 

1895 births
1978 deaths
People from Harefield
Middlesex Regiment soldiers
British Army personnel of World War I
British Battle of the Somme recipients of the Victoria Cross
British Army recipients of the Victoria Cross
British World War I recipients of the Victoria Cross
Recipients of the Bronze Medal of Military Valor